Wladimir Ramon Balentien (born July 2, 1984), nicknamed "Coco", is a Curaçaoan-Dutch professional baseball outfielder who is currently a free agent. He played in Major League Baseball (MLB) for the Seattle Mariners and Cincinnati Reds, and in Nippon Professional Baseball (NPB) for the Tokyo Yakult Swallows and Fukuoka SoftBank Hawks.

In 2013, he broke the NPB single-season home run record of 55, previously held by professional baseball's all-time home run leader Sadaharu Oh, American Tuffy Rhodes, and Venezuelan Alex Cabrera. Balentien finished the season with 60 home runs.

Professional career

Seattle Mariners
He made his professional debut in 2003 with the AZL Mariners. He split the 2004 season between the Single-A Wisconsin Timber Rattlers and the High-A Inland Empire 66ers, accumulating a .279/.321/.513 batting line with 17 home runs and 51 RBI. The next year, Balentien spent the season with Inland Empire, batting .291/.338/.553 with 25 home runs and 93 RBI in 123 games. In 2006, Balentien played for the Double-A San Antonio Missions, posting a batting line of .230/.337/.435 to go along with 22 home runs and 82 RBI. In , he was assigned to the Triple-A Tacoma Rainiers for the season.

Balentien was selected to the All-Star Futures Game in San Francisco that year, a result of his .328 batting average, 20 home runs, and 66 runs batted in by that point. He was called up to the major leagues with the Mariners on September 4, 2007, and made his MLB debut that night against the New York Yankees at Yankee Stadium. Balentien pinch-hit for José Guillén in the 8th inning, and hit a two-run double in his first major league at-bat.

However, the starting job in right field went to Brad Wilkerson, and Balentien was optioned to Triple-A Tacoma on March 24. When Wilkerson and first baseman Greg Norton were designated for assignment on April 30, Wladimir and Rainiers teammate Jeff Clement were called up to the big leagues for a game in Cleveland against the Indians.

Facing Indians starter Cliff Lee in the top of the 7th inning, Balentien hit a three-run homer over the right field fence to end Lee's streak of 27 scoreless innings pitched. His homer was one of only 12 given up by Lee in 2008.

On July 25, 2009, Balentien was designated for assignment by the Mariners after struggling to make consistent contact. He hit .213 with 4 home runs and 13 RBIs in 155 at bats to that point in the season. Michael Saunders was called up to take his place on the big league roster.

Cincinnati Reds
On July 29, 2009 the Mariners traded Balentien to the Cincinnati Reds for reliever Robert Manuel. In his final game with the Reds against Pittsburgh Pirates on October 2, Balentien hit the longest home run of that major league season, midway up the upper deck in left field with an estimated distance of 500 feet. On April 14, 2010, Balentien was outrighted off of the 40-man roster. He spent the entire season with the Triple-A Louisville Bats, slashing .282 in 116 games before electing free agency on November 6, 2010.

Tokyo Yakult Swallows
On November 16, 2010, Balentien signed with the Tokyo Yakult Swallows in Japan. In the 2011 season, he became the home run leader of the Central League, hitting 31 home runs on the year. In 2012, Balentien led the league with 31 home runs, but did not reach the minimum requirement of plate appearances, having only taken 422 trips to the plate. On August 29, 2013, Balentien hit his 51st home run of the 2013 season.  With over a month of the regular season remaining at that date, many speculated that Balentien could break the Nippon Professional Baseball league season record.  The record of 55 home runs in a single season was originally set by Sadaharu Oh in 1964 and later tied by Tuffy Rhodes and Alex Cabrera. A "Coco Meter" was added to Tokyo Swallows homepage so that fans could track his progress through the remainder of the season. On September 10, 2013, Balentien hit his 55th home run. He subsequently broke the record, hitting his 56th and 57th home runs, on September 15, 2013 at home against the Hanshin Tigers, ultimately finishing the season with 60 total home runs and 131 RBI in 130 games.

Late in the 2013 season, it was revealed that NPB had secretly introduced a livelier baseball, resulting in a marked increase in home runs league-wide. Three-term NPB commissioner Ryozo Kato was forced to resign over the scandal when the juiced baseball was revealed. In 2014, Balentien played in 112 games for Yakult, slashing .301/.419/.587 with 31 home runs and 69 RBI.

Balentien only appeared in 15 games in 2015 due to injury, and in 2016 he batted .269/.369/.516 with 31 home runs and 96 RBI. In 2017, Balentien hit .254/.358/.506 with 32 home runs and 80 RBI in 125 games. In 2018 for Yakult, Balentien posted a .268/.370/.533 batting line with 38 home runs and 131 RBI on the year and was selected to the 2018 NPB All-Star game. In 2019, Balentien slashed .280/.363/.554 with 33 home runs and 93 RBI in 120 games. On December 2, 2019, he became a free agent.

Fukuoka SoftBank Hawks
On December 16, 2019, Balentien signed with the Fukuoka SoftBank Hawks. In the 2020 season, Balentien finished the regular season with a batting average of .168, 9 home runs, and 22 RBI in 60 games. He was selected to the Japan Series roster for the Hawks in the 2020 Japan Series.
Balentien began the 2021 season with the Hawks' farm team in the Japan Western League.  He returned to the big-league team in May. On June 13, he passed two statistical milestones in a single game against the Yakult Swallows: he hit his 300th NPB home run and his 1,000th hit. 

On January 22, 2022, Balentien announced his retirement from Japanese baseball.

Saraperos de Saltillo
On February 13, 2022, Balentien signed with the Saraperos de Saltillo of the Mexican League. In 18 games, he batted .231/.351/.477 with 4 home runs and 11 RBIs. Balentien was released by the team on May 25, 2022.

International career
Balentien represented Team Netherlands at the 2004 Summer Olympics, the 2013 World Baseball Classic, 2015 WBSC Premier12, the 2017 World Baseball Classic and the 2023 World Baseball Classic. Following the conclusion of the 2017 WBC tournament, he was named to the 2017 All-World Baseball Classic team.

References

External links

 Retrosheet
 NPB.jp
 4 Wladimir Balentien PLAYERS2021 - Fukuoka SoftBank Hawks Official site
 Pura Pelota (Venezuelan Winter League)
 
 

1984 births
Living people
Arizona League Mariners players
Baseball players at the 2004 Summer Olympics
Cardenales de Lara players
Cincinnati Reds players
Curaçao baseball players
Curaçao expatriate baseball players in Japan
Curaçao expatriate baseball players in Mexico
Curaçao expatriate baseball players in the United States
Dutch people of Curaçao descent
Fukuoka SoftBank Hawks players
Inland Empire 66ers of San Bernardino players
Louisville Bats players
Major League Baseball outfielders
Major League Baseball players from Curaçao
Navegantes del Magallanes players
Curaçao expatriate baseball players in Venezuela
Nippon Professional Baseball left fielders
Nippon Professional Baseball MVP Award winners
Nippon Professional Baseball right fielders
Olympic baseball players of the Netherlands
People from Willemstad
San Antonio Missions players
Saraperos de Saltillo players
Seattle Mariners players
Tacoma Rainiers players
Tokyo Yakult Swallows players
Wisconsin Timber Rattlers players
2015 WBSC Premier12 players
2013 World Baseball Classic players
2017 World Baseball Classic players
2023 World Baseball Classic players